In wildfires, a holdover fire, zombie fire or overwintering fire is a peat fire which persists from year to year.

Fires
Such fires typically occur in Arctic tundra, smouldering during the winter under the snow and then becoming more intense during the summer.

A study conducted 2002–2018 in Alaska and the Northwest Territories found that this type of fire burned only 0.8% of the total area burned by all types of fires and that this type of fire caused only 0.5% of the total carbon emissions released by all types of fires.

During the summer of 2019, such fires were estimated to have generated 173 million tonnes of carbon dioxide, with an estimate of 244 million tonnes from January to August 2019. The smoke and soot from such fires darkens the region, so contributing to further warming and further fires. Images from satellites such as Sentinel-2 have been used to identify such hot spots.

See also
 Arctic methane emissions
 Climate change
 Polar amplification

Further reading

References

External links

Types of fire
Fire prevention
Wildfires